Elhanan, son of Jaare-Oregim the Bethlehemite is a character in 2 Samuel 21:19, where he is credited with killing Goliath: 
"There was another battle with the Philistines at Gob, and Elhanan son of Jaare-oregim the Bethlehemite killed Goliath the Gittite, the shaft of whose spear was like a weaver's beam." In 1 Chronicles 20:5, he is called Elhanan, son of Jair, ( ʾElḥānān ben-Yāʿīr) indicating that "Jaare-oregim", is a garbled corruption of the name Jair and the word for "beam" used in the verse (ʾōrəgīm). 

The combat with Goliath was re-worked into the story of David in 1 Samuel 17, but crediting Goliath's death to David instead of Elhanan created a problem. The 4th century BC Book of Chronicles resolved it by describing how "Elhanan the son of Jair killed Lahmi the brother of Goliath the Gittite" (1 Chronicles 20:5), constructing the name Lahmi from the last portion of the word "Bethlehemite" (beit ha-lahmi), the King James Bible by modifying 2 Samuel 21:18–19 to make it read as if Elhanan had slain Goliath's brother ("And there was again a battle in Gob with the Philistines, where Elhanan the son of Jaare–oregim, a Bethlehemite, slew the brother of Goliath the Gittite, the staff of whose spear was like a weaver's beam"), although the Hebrew makes no mention of the word "brother", and the Targum, a translation of the Hebrew scriptures into Aramaic, identified Elhanan with David as both were from Bethlehem (targum 2 Samuel 21:19), although this creates yet another problem in that Elhanan is listed as one of David's followers and the killings occur in different places.

See also
 Books of Chronicles
 Book of Samuel
 Elhanan, son of Dodo, one of David's elite warriors

References

Citations

Bibliography

 
 
 
 

Goliath
People of the Kingdom of Israel (united monarchy)
People from Bethlehem
Books of Chronicles people